The 1928 Missouri Tigers football team was an American football team that represented the University of Missouri in the Big Six Conference (Big 6) during the 1928 college football season. The team compiled a 4–4 record (3–2 against Big 6 opponents), finished in a tie for second place in the Big 6, and outscored all opponents by a combined total of 138 to 102. Gwinn Henry was the head coach for the fifth of nine seasons. The team played its home games at Memorial Stadium in Columbia, Missouri.

The team's leading scorer was Robert Mehrle with 32 points.

Schedule

References

Missouri
Missouri Tigers football seasons
Missouri Tigers football